The EyeToy is a color webcam for use with the PlayStation 2. Supported games use computer vision and gesture recognition to process images taken by the EyeToy. This allows players to interact with the games using motion, color detection, and also sound, through its built-in microphone. It was released in 2003.

The camera is manufactured by Logitech (known as "Logicool" in Japan), although newer EyeToys are manufactured by Namtai. The camera is mainly used for playing EyeToy games developed by Sony and other companies. It is not intended for use as a normal PC camera, although some programmers have written unofficial drivers for it. The EyeToy is compatible with the PlayStation 3 and can be used for video chatting. As of November 6, 2008, the EyeToy has sold 10.5 million units worldwide.

History
The EyeToy was conceived by Richard Marks in 1999, after witnessing a demonstration of the PlayStation 2 at the 1999 Game Developers Conference in San Jose, California. Marks' idea was to enable natural user interface and mixed reality video game applications using an inexpensive webcam, using the computational power of the PlayStation 2 to implement computer vision and gesture recognition technologies. He joined Sony Computer Entertainment America (SCEA) that year, and worked on the technology as Special Projects Manager for Research and Development.

Marks' work drew the attention of Phil Harrison, then Vice President of Third Party Relations and Research and Development at SCEA. Soon after being promoted to Senior Vice President of Product Development at Sony Computer Entertainment Europe (SCEE) in 2000, Harrison brought Marks to the division's headquarters in London to demonstrate the technology to a number of developers. At the demonstration, Marks was joined with Ron Festejo of Psygnosis (which would later merge to become London Studio) to begin developing a software title using the technology, which would later become EyeToy: Play. Originally called the iToy (short for "interactive toy") by the London branch, the webcam was later renamed to the EyeToy by Harrison. It was first demonstrated to the public at the PlayStation Experience event in August 2002 with four minigames.

Already planned for release in Europe, the EyeToy was picked by SCE's Japanese and American branches after the successful showing at the PlayStation Experience. In 2003, EyeToy was released in a bundle with EyeToy: Play: in Europe on July 4, and North America on November 4. By the end of the year, the EyeToy sold over 2 million units in Europe and 400,000 units in the United States. On February 11, 2004, the EyeToy was released in Japan.

Design
The camera is mounted on a pivot, allowing for positioning. Focusing the camera is performed by rotating a ring around the lens. It comes with two LED lights on the front. A blue light turns on when the PS2 is on, indicating that it is ready to be used, while the red light flashes when there is insufficient light in the room. It also contains a built-in microphone. 

The original logo and product design for the camera was designed by Sony employee Oliver Wright. A second, newer model of the EyeToy was also made, but sports a smaller size and silver casing. Apart from smaller electronics, no internal improvements had been made to the new model, and it's functionality stayed the same as the old EyeToy.

Use with personal computers
Since the EyeToy is essentially a webcam inside a casing designed to match the PlayStation 2 and it uses a USB 1.1 protocol and USB plug, it is possible to make it work on other systems relatively easily. Drivers have been created to make it work with many computer operating systems, however, Linux is the only OS which has drivers installed yet no official drivers have been offered by Namtai, Logitech, or Sony for Microsoft Windows, macOS, or Linux. The type of driver required depends on the model of EyeToy camera. There are three different models:

SLEH-00030
SLEH-00031
SCEH-0004

The model information is included in a label on the bottom of the camera.

In these custom drivers, the red LED that normally signals inadequate lighting is used as the active recording indicator. The blue LED is lit when the EyeToy is plugged into the computer.

Games

Designed for EyeToy
25 games require the EyeToy for them to be played. All but the 2 Korean-exclusive ones were released in PAL Regions, while only 8 (with 2 third party) titles were released in North America.

Enhanced with EyeToy
These games may be used with the EyeToy optionally. They typically have an "Enhanced with EyeToy" or "EyeToy Enhanced" label on the box.
AFL Premiership 2005 (IR Gurus, 2005)
AFL Premiership 2006 (IR Gurus, 2006)
AFL Premiership 2007 (IR Gurus, 2007)
AND 1 Streetball
Buzz! The Music Quiz (Sony, late 2005)
Burnout Paradise (Criterion, 2008) - When you start the game for the first time on the PS3, it can use the Eyetoy to take a picture to be used on the License card.
Buzz! The Big Quiz (Sony, March 2006)
CMT Presents: Karaoke Revolution Country
Dance Dance Revolution Extreme (North America) (Konami, 2004) – EyeToy mini games, players can optionally see themselves dancing, additional mode with 2 camera targets.
DDR Festival Dance Dance Revolution (Konami, 2004) – EyeToy mini games, players can optionally see themselves dancing, additional mode with 2 camera targets.
Dancing Stage Fusion (Konami, 2004) – EyeToy mini games, players can optionally see themselves dancing, additional mode with 2 camera targets.
Dance Dance Revolution Extreme 2 (Konami, 2005) – EyeToy mini games, players can optionally see themselves dancing, additional mode with 2 camera targets.
Dancing Stage Max (Konami, 2005) – EyeToy mini games, players can optionally see themselves dancing, additional mode with 2 camera targets.
Dance Dance Revolution Strike (Konami, 2006) – EyeToy mini games, players can optionally see themselves dancing, additional mode with 2 camera targets.
Dance Dance Revolution SuperNova (North America) (Konami, 2006) – EyeToy mini games, players can optionally see themselves dancing, additional mode with 2 camera targets.
Dance Dance Revolution SuperNova (Konami, 2007) – EyeToy mini games, players can optionally see themselves dancing, additional mode with 2 camera targets.
Dancing Stage SuperNova (Europe) (Konami, 2007) – EyeToy mini games, players can optionally see themselves dancing, additional mode with 2 camera targets.
Dance Dance Revolution SuperNova 2 (North America) (Konami, 2007) – EyeToy mini games, players can optionally see themselves dancing, additional mode with 2 camera targets.
Dance Dance Revolution SuperNova 2 (Konami, 2008) – EyeToy mini games, players can optionally see themselves dancing, additional mode with 2 camera targets.
Dance Dance Revolution X (North America) (Konami, 2008) – EyeToy mini games, players can optionally see themselves dancing, additional mode with 2 camera targets.
Dance Dance Revolution X2 (North America) (Konami, 2009) – EyeToy mini games, players can optionally see themselves dancing, additional mode with 2 camera targets.
Dance Factory – players can optionally see themselves dancing, additional mode with 2 camera targets.
DT Racer (XS Games, 2005) – Take a photo using the EyeToy camera and use as driver licence photo in-game and during races in first-person view you can see your reflection in the rear-view mirror.
Formula One 05 (Sony, mid-2004)
Flow: Urban Dance Uprising
Gaelic Games: Football
Get On Da Mic (Eidos Interactive, 2004) – players can see their performance
Gran Turismo 4 - used to unlock the Nike One concept car, intended for buyers of a Nike limited edition of the game
Gretzky NHL 2005
Harry Potter and the Prisoner of Azkaban (Electronic Arts, 2004) – features EyeToy minigames
Jackie Chan Adventures (Sony, 2004) – features Eye Toy minigames
Karaoke Revolution Party
Karaoke Revolution Presents: American Idol
Lemmings (Team17, 2006)
L'eredità (Milestone srl, 2003) – used for player avatars
LittleBigPlanet (Media Molecule, 2008) – Although released on the PS3 and designed for PlayStation Eye, it is EyeToy compatible. Players can take pictures to be used as in-game stickers for placement on walls and other surfaces
LMA Manager 2005 (Codemasters, 2004) – players can have their pictures on in-game newspapers
MLB 2005
MLB 2006 – used to create a player
MLB '06: The Show
MLB '07: The Show
MLB '08: The Show
MLB '09: The Show
MLB 10: The Show
MLB 11: The Show
NBA 07
Racing Battle: C1 Grand Prix (Genki, 2005) – Used to capture textures to be used as car stickers in the bodypaint interface
SingStar series (Sony, 2004–2008) – singers can optionally see themselves when singing
The Sims 2 – players can take pictures of themselves, then put it on the wall or make their Sims paint it
Stuart Little 3: Big Photo Adventure
The Polar Express (THQ, 2004)
The Sims 2: Pets
The Urbz: Sims in the City (Electronic Arts, 2004) – players can have their faces on in-game billboards
This Is Football 2005
Tony Hawk's American Wasteland (Activision) – Used to import the player's face onto a created skater.
Tony Hawk's Underground 2 (Activision, 2004) – Player can capture an image of their face and map it onto their character.
Vib-Ripple (NanaOn-Sha, 2004) — Players can take photos, and use them as stages.
YetiSports Arctic Adventures (JoWood Productions, 2005) – EyeToy multi-player games
Who Wants To Be A Millionaire? Party Edition (Eidos Interactive, late 2006) – players can have their 'mugshots' on a winning check
World Tour Soccer 2006

Cameo
EyeToy: Cameo is a system for allowing players to include their own images as avatars in other games. Games that support the feature include a head scanning program that can be used to generate a 3D model of the player's head. Once stored on a memory card, this file is then available in games that support the Cameo feature. EyeToy: Cameo licenses the head creation technology Digimask.

See also
List of games compatible with EyeToy
Mixed reality
Dreameye, the first camera accessory for a home gaming console, used on the Dreamcast
PlayStation Eye, the successor to the EyeToy for the PlayStation 3
Xbox Live Vision, a similar camera made for the Xbox 360
Kinect, a similar device made for the Xbox 360

References

PlayStation 2 accessories
Logitech products
Webcams
Products introduced in 2003
Interactive Achievement Award winners
Gesture recognition